Reincarnation is a 2008 fantasy novel by American author Suzanne Weyn. The novel was released on January 1, 2008. It tells the story of a two lovers who attempt to find each other through the centuries. The narrative follows the action through time. The individuals are followed throughout Ancient Egypt, Ancient Greece, the American Civil War, Paris (Just prior to World War II), the 1960s in the United States, and finally as modern day teenagers.

Plot 
Prehistory
In the first setting of the story the female protagonist is a Cro-Magnon (more developed caveman), and the male protagonist is a Neanderthal, man a little behind Cro-Magnon in evolution, thus unable to capture the concept of speech. The female, May, is ready to get married soon, and will be linked to Lenar by her deity, the Great Mother. The male, Kye is hunting with his group. They meet each other near the cave that May visits when they spot a green rock. They struggle over the stone. May wanted it so that she could have her own ranking within her tribe, to be able to not marry an insensitive tribesman, Lenar, the first antagonist in the book. Kye wants it so that he may redeem himself within his tribe, for he had run away from a fight.

The second antagonist is revealed through the perspective of Lenar as a female in his and May's tribe, Sha, who would gladly marry Lenar and has red curls which are passed down to her next lives.

Future incarnations inherit May's singing, struggle with ranking in social groups, and that she is religious, and Kye's incarnations inherit aching head injuries. The incarnations also happen to be different in ethnicity like May and Kye.

Egypt, 1280 B.C.E.
The second setting is in ancient Egypt, in the setting of a wealthy nobleman. The female protagonist's name is Tetisheri, and she is the household singer and dancer, the performer. The male protagonist is Taharaq, a captured Nubian archer, who has been dragged into slavery by Egyptians. He was captured because he chose to shoot from the ground, a result of his fear of heights caused by his previous death. Due to an injury during the fight he is mute, unable to speak. 
He becomes a slave in the same household Tetisheri works and lives in. He was caught and given to the nobleman by the male antagonist, Ramose. 
The female antagonist is introduced as Nerfi, a household servant whom is unsatisfied with her position.
The green gem is reincarnated as an Eye of Horus pendant that Ramose gives to Tetisheri, as he wishes to marry her when he returns from a military voyage.
While Ramose is away Taharaq and Tetisheri realize their love for each other and Taharaq heals, able to speak again. Seeing them together angered Ramose, who hits Tetisheri. Taharaq punches Ramose, knocking him out, and takes the pendant in hopes of being able to pay for his passage to escape his slavery. Tetisheri climbs into Tahataq's room and is stabbed by Ramose when he catches Tetisheri.

Further incarnations inherit Tetisheri's bad ankle that was injured when Nerfi dropped a jug of water on her right foot and a knack for archery from Taharaq. Ramose's incarnations would inherit an aching jaw from when Taharaq punched Ramose.

Pakistan, 538 B.C.E.   
The male protagonist on the wheel of rebirth meets Siddartha, later Buddha. This is the reason for his later interest in Buddhism. He also drinks too much wine and becomes drunk, which is the cause of the drinking problem in later incarnations.

Athens, Greece, 399 B.C.E.
The female protagonist is Hyacinth, a nobleman's privileged daughter, and the male protagonist is Artem, a "wild boy" orphan whose Egyptian mother died, a slave woman found him with two emerald teardrop-shaped earrings. Living and wandering alone in the wilderness, he has a drinking problem. Hyacinth meets Artem in the marketplace and cannot forget him. Hyacinth later catches Artem hunting on her father's land. She follows him to his camp and they meet and talk for a while. Artem has inherited his passion for reading and writing from a previous life, and offers to teach Hyacinth to read, as women were thought to be servers for men in that period. 
The two keep meeting for their "reading lessons" but really they're falling in love, Hyacinth more so than Artem, at first.
Artem, being a skilled archer, is convinced to compete for Hyacinth's hand in marriage against Macar, the male antagonist. But Macar catches the two together, and later attacks Artem, making him unable to go and compete for Hyacinth. 
Hyacinth is heartbroken, and by the time Artem is healed enough to go to her she has become a priestess at the temple of Athena, and having become a priestess, under oath, she is unable to leave or to marry. 
The reincarnation of Blind Seth, the Oracle of Delphi, who foretells the future in riddles that only the learned could decipher, speaks to Hyacinth, and says, "You have been in the cave. I spied on you in the kitchen. I will bring you to fiery ruin. The jewel is not what you think. You must seek its meaning. If you seek me I will help you." Hyacinth tried to understand her words, she had never been in a cave, but she had sometimes been in a kitchen, and when she thought of the jewels, she thought of her earrings. 
The Oracle continued, "The one who comes for you with the earrings is your destiny."
Hyacinth thought about Artem. She still did not understand, "Please, I don't understand."
"The unraveling is the journey.' the Oracle answered. And she left.
Honouring her oath, Hyacinth refuses to run away with Artem, and when he finally comes to her, even though she wants to, she doesn't leave, but keeps the emerald earrings Artem gave her. The female antagonist is revealed as Iphigenia, another young priestess who is insanely jealous of Hyacinth and Artem's love and thinks negatively of Hyacinth turning him down, thinking she would run away with him in a heartbeat. She steals Hyacinth's earrings, and one night when Artem is serenading Hyacinth with his flute, as always, and she sees that Hyacinth is finally climbing down to join Artem. Iphigenia then throws the earrings out the window. 
Artem thinks Hyacinth has thrown the earrings, and bumps into Hyacinth as they both go to retrieve them. But that makes Hyacinth tumble down a rocky hill to her death, leaving Artem to be miserable for the rest of his life.

Canaan, 28 C.E.
The male protagonist is now in Canaan, who went to the wedding Jesus gave wine to. This is evident for he complains he drinks in excess.

Gwendolyn, the female protagonist, becomes part of an abbey and later is Mother Abbess Maria Regina. She dies and the next person who speaks is the male antagonist, a captain who took slaves, a possible manifestation of his treatment to Taharaq as Ramose. The male protagonist is his first mate and later goes on an adventure with Pizarro. There he meets Gwendolyn, now Acana, in an Incan tribe and remarks on her knowledge of the arts and in general. It is revealed she died of the pox. Abby, the female antagonist, is setting sail for America where next story takes place.

Salem, Massachusetts, 1691
The female protagonist is Elizabeth May, the male protagonist is Brian, the male antagonist  is Charles, and the female antagonist is Abigail O'Brian (Abby). Abby wants to get rid of Elizabeth May so that she can have Charles, Elizabeth's well-to-do husband. Brian is never actually in the story, but rather a fond memory of Elizabeth May's. As it turns out, she knows the incarnation of old Seth, the man in Egypt who knew her and lived in the same house. His incarnation is a Barbados woman who is blind and she tells Elizabeth her future with tarot cards. The cards say she has lost a true love, Brian, but will see him again. Elizabeth May warns the Barbados woman that a few village ladies have accused her of witchery because of her strange, natural medicines.
To get Elizabeth May out of the picture, Abby gets Charles thinking that she's having an affair, and shows him peridot earrings from Brian. When he shows Elizabeth May the earrings and refuses to give them back, she attacks him. Abby brings in a lawman and accuses her of being a witch, pointing out Charles's bloodied face, and just then Elizabeth May's black cat jumps into her arms. Due to May's death by burning at the stake, she now has a phobia of fire.

In between
Abby is now dead (having married Charles), surpassing her husband as 80 years old. It is discovered that Brian had a daughter back home. His wife writes in a journal that their baby girl dies. It was the female protagonist for she hysterically screams at a peat fire.

In between The female protagonist is reincarnated as Marianna Clark, a woman who goes insane due to constantly saying her skin felt like it was on fire and is eventually locked up in a mental asylum, where Gwendolyn's church used to be. The staff give her a drug called laudanum every waking moment to soothe her, which, in a later life causes her to be addicted to the drug. Her male counterpart is reincarnated as the man who helped in the discovery of the Rosetta Stone.

The Battle of Honey Springs, Indian Territory, July 17, 1863
Louisa Jones is a fifteen-year-old African American girl who is disguised as a man during the Civil War, she goes by the name of Lou. She was a slave but ran away and was now in the war fighting against the South. The story is told from the third person view of both characters, but the first part is told from John Mays, the first male incarnation of the female protagonist, a white man. This is evident because he was addicted to the medicine to numb the pain from his Bad Ankle and fear of fire. Louisa and John are fighting against the South.  It says that when he is first injured, he sees a boy at the river, taking care of a wound. It says that he can't explain his desire for the boy, but walks over and talks to him. John doesn't know that the boy is really a girl, Louisa, the incarnation of the male protagonist, because he/she had a birthmark looking like a Stab Wound. 
A strange thing happened to Lou while she was fighting that day, it was the reason she was cleaning up a wound. She was surrounded by smoke from the gunshots, when a Cherokee Indian was shot and flew off of his horse and fell on top of Lou, making her gun out of reach. The same man who shot the Indian, was about to shoot Lou also, but she got the Indian's 
They talk, feeling a "connection" between each other, but are interrupted when a Native American tries to kill John. Lou then pulls the trigger of her rifle and kills the Native American. John then begins to like her/him, but won't say or show anything, thinking that Lou is a guy. 
Later on, it is told from Lou's third person when she feels the big bruise on the side of her stomach that is actually a birth mark. She ran into John again when she went out for a quick drink and he tries to get her to join the rest of the soldiers by the camp fire, but Lou refuses, saying that her side really hurts. Lou then faints due to the pain of her side and earlier injury to the head and John puts her back into the tent she was in. That's when he finds out that she's a girl, but she then dies of her injuries.

Paris, France, 1937
The female protagonist is now Delilah "Del" Jones, a performer, performing at "The Panther Club". The male protagonist is Robert "Bert" Brody, a reporter from Princeton. Bert interviews Del after a performance and she begins to flirt with him after a few questions. She admits that she can dance, but most of the time ends up falling due to her bad ankle. Bert then goes out with a dancer at the club, named Yvette, after he interviews Del. After he left the small meeting with Yvette, he's stopped by a cop working for British Intelligence. Back in the dressing room, the male antagonist, Lenny Raymond, the club manager, rubs his aching jaw as he thinks about Del and which move he should make on her. He gives up eventually. 
The next day, Del meets up with Bert again, for the rest of the interview. She'd lied to him about being in the circus, and he, in return, tells her about his great adventures in Greece. There's a candle sitting in the middle of the table and Del asks the waiter to remove it. She then says to Bert that she's skittish about fire. He then asks her if she's interested in Buddhism and she says that it's strange. They then admit that some feeling is so strong between them. The next day, Bert was sure he was in love with Del. For a next performance, Bert went to see it. Del then told Yvette that she wanted to speak to her in private on the roof. Bert followed to find Lenny, Yvette, Del and him all on the roof. Nazis then fired at Del and Bert jumped in front of her, taking the bullets. He fell off the roof and died.

In between The story is then told from the view of the ghost of the male protagonist. He goes a few years forward in time- to the height of World War II- and finds Yvette on a death train bound for a concentration camp. He finds out that Del is still alive, and that she and Yvette were both spies for the French Underground. Yvette was eventually caught. When the train derails, allowing many to escape, Yvette shows her good side and saves a young child- only to be shot by a Gestapo agent who catches her in the act. Yvette, too, becomes a ghost, reunites with Bert, and together, they enter the next stage of reincarnation.

Mississippi 1964
The m.p. is now Mike. He's riding in a car with his friends while his Brother the m.a., Ray, rubs his jaw. He went home and noticed an old record player. It reminded him about a collection of albums by some famous singer he'd never heard of; Delilah Jones . He played it and a jazz tune played about a lover who got away. 
The f.p. is an elderly lady named Louisa. It's early in the morning when Mike is going door-to-door asking people if they are registered to vote or not. He then asks her about her rights of an American. He soon admits that it's hot and she invites him inside. She then asks him if she's met him before and says that it's deja vu. She says that she felt it when he admitted that he attended Princeton and that he felt it too. She fainted. As he helped her recover, he noticed books and things on bookshelves. He then saw a book called Their Eyes Were Watching God and it was signed by the author, Zora Neale Hurston. It was to Delilah Jones. He'd heard that name before and asked her who she was. Louisa then admitted that she was Del Jones and that Mike was Bert Brody. He was confused, so she explained to him that she went back to her given name, Louisa, and she said that she married Lenny Raymond. She then explains that Bert Brody was her songwriter and that the songs on her album were written by him. Mike eventually is astonished and quickly leaves. Upon being away he returns that night, bringing her a record of her songs. They spend the next two weeks together. They are unable to show physical affection because of their age difference, but are in love nonetheless. He then ends up in the police station with his friends, upon hearing Ray is in trouble for being with Birdy, the f.a. On his way to get help to bail them out of jail he is struck by a speeding car.

In between There are no incarnations of the m.p. in this chapter.

New York, present day
The female is Samantha Tyler, a typical senior high-schooler. The male is Jake Suarez, the new guy at school, and the guy who just won first place in the archery competition. He also wrote a screenplay that he thinks he made up, but really he's telling the story of him and Samantha in the Salem lifetime. It's very emotional, because even though Samantha doesn't know it she's being told that Brian (Jake) had come looking for Elizabeth May (herself) and was miserable for the rest of his life when he was too late.
It's a short one, so all that happens with the two antagonists, Chris and Zoë, is that Sam breaks up with Chris, and Zoë had a crush on him and fully supported her friend in this decision.

The senior class is on a field trip to the Museum of Natural History. Samantha and Jake just happen to be lost and alone, looking for everyone else, and bump into each other. they decide to walk to the Hall of Emeralds exhibit together. Jake tells about his screenplay got him a scholarship, and Sam tells him about she can't decide between singing or dancing for her college studies, and about how it's lucky she wore corrective shoes as a kid for her bad ankle, otherwise she wouldn't be able to dance.

Being in the Hall of Emeralds is also mysterious for them, because there they see all of the green gems through their history. Tetisheri's Eye of Horus pendant, Baby's (and Del's) emerald studded collar, one of the teardrop earrings, even though it wasn't real emerald, but peridot, and even the gem that May and Kye fought over, which also wasn't real emerald.

They finally admit the strong emotions for each other they are miraculously feeling while in the museum theatre. Nobody dies; they're together at last.

Trivia 

As a side note, the cat also seems to be reincarnated. It starts as a wild cat that pp Tetisheri finds and brings home. In most of the stories there seems to be a wild cat i.e.: a cheetah, a black cat, and a black and orange kitten.

External links
Scholastic Books

2008 American novels
American fantasy novels
Novels about reincarnation
American romance novels
Fiction about neanderthals
Scholastic Corporation books